Tropical cyclogenesis is the development and strengthening of a tropical cyclone in the atmosphere. The mechanisms through which tropical cyclogenesis occurs are distinctly different from those through which temperate cyclogenesis occurs. Tropical cyclogenesis involves the development of a warm-core cyclone, due to significant convection in a favorable atmospheric environment.

Tropical cyclogenesis requires six main factors: sufficiently warm sea surface temperatures (at least ), atmospheric instability, high humidity in the lower to middle levels of the troposphere, enough Coriolis force to develop a low-pressure center, a pre-existing low-level focus or disturbance, and low vertical wind shear.

Tropical cyclones tend to develop during the summer, but have been noted in nearly every month in most basins. Climate cycles such as ENSO and the Madden–Julian oscillation modulate the timing and frequency of tropical cyclone development.  There is a limit on tropical cyclone intensity which is strongly related to the water temperatures along its path.

An average of 86 tropical cyclones of tropical storm intensity form annually worldwide.

Requirements for tropical cyclone formation

There are six main requirements for tropical cyclogenesis: sufficiently warm sea surface temperatures, atmospheric instability, high humidity in the lower to middle levels of the troposphere, enough Coriolis force to sustain a low pressure center, a preexisting low level focus or disturbance, and low vertical wind shear. While these conditions are necessary for tropical cyclone formation, they do not guarantee that a tropical cyclone will form.

Warm waters, instability, and mid-level moisture

Normally, an ocean temperature of 26.5 °C (79.7 °F) spanning through at least a 50-metre depth is considered the minimum to maintain a tropical cyclone. These warm waters are needed to maintain the warm core that fuels tropical systems. This value is well above 16.1 °C (60.9 °F), the global average surface temperature of the oceans.

Tropical cyclones are known to form even when normal conditions are not met. For example, cooler air temperatures at a higher altitude (e.g., at the 500 hPa level, or 5.9 km) can lead to tropical cyclogenesis at lower water temperatures, as a certain lapse rate is required to force the atmosphere to be unstable enough for convection. In a moist atmosphere, this lapse rate is 6.5 °C/km, while in an atmosphere with less than 100% relative humidity, the required lapse rate is 9.8 °C/km.

At the 500 hPa level, the air temperature averages −7 °C (18 °F) within the tropics, but air in the tropics is normally dry at this level, giving the air room to wet-bulb, or cool as it moistens, to a more favorable temperature that can then support convection. A wetbulb temperature at 500 hPa in a tropical atmosphere of −13.2 °C is required to initiate convection if the water temperature is 26.5 °C, and this temperature requirement increases or decreases proportionally by 1 °C in the sea surface temperature for each 1 °C change at 500 hpa.
Under a cold cyclone, 500 hPa temperatures can fall as low as −30 °C, which can initiate convection even in the driest atmospheres. This also explains why moisture in the mid-levels of the troposphere, roughly at the 500 hPa level, is normally a requirement for development. However, when dry air is found at the same height, temperatures at 500 hPa need to be even colder as dry atmospheres require a greater lapse rate for instability than moist atmospheres. At heights near the tropopause, the 30-year average temperature (as measured in the period encompassing 1961 through 1990) was −77 °C (−105 °F).  A recent example of a tropical cyclone that maintained itself over cooler waters was Epsilon  of the 2005 Atlantic hurricane season.

Role of Maximum Potential Intensity (MPI)
Kerry Emanuel created a mathematical model around 1988 to compute the upper limit of tropical cyclone intensity based on sea surface temperature and atmospheric profiles from the latest global model runs. Emanuel's model is called the maximum potential intensity, or MPI. Maps created from this equation show regions where tropical storm and hurricane formation is possible, based upon the thermodynamics of the atmosphere at the time of the last model run. This does not take into account vertical wind shear.

Coriolis force

The Coriolis force imparts rotation on the flow and arises as winds begin to flow in toward the lower pressure created by the pre-existing disturbance. In areas with a very small or non-existent Coriolis force (e.g. near the Equator), the only significant atmospheric forces in play are the pressure gradient force (the pressure difference that causes winds to blow from high to low pressure) and a smaller friction force; these two alone would not cause the large-scale rotation required for tropical cyclogenesis. The existence of a significant Coriolis force allows the developing vortex to achieve gradient wind balance. This is a balance condition found in mature tropical cyclones that allows latent heat to concentrate near the storm core; this results in the maintenance or intensification of the vortex if other development factors are neutral.

Low level disturbance
Whether it be a depression in the Intertropical Convergence Zone (ITCZ), a tropical wave, a broad surface front, or an outflow boundary, a low level feature with sufficient vorticity and convergence is required to begin tropical cyclogenesis. Even with perfect upper-level conditions and the required atmospheric instability, the lack of a surface focus will prevent the development of organized convection and a surface low.  Tropical cyclones can form when smaller circulations within the Intertropical Convergence Zone come together and merge.

Weak vertical wind shear

[[File: Fiona 2022-09-16 1323Z.pngTropical Storm Fiona in 2022, with its low-level centre partially exposed due to strong windshear.]]
Vertical wind shear of less than 10 m/s (20 kt, 22 mph) between the surface and the tropopause is favored for tropical cyclone development. A weaker vertical shear makes the storm grow faster vertically into the air, which helps the storm develop and become stronger. If the vertical shear is too strong, the storm cannot rise to its full potential and its energy becomes spread out over too large of an area for the storm to strengthen.  Strong wind shear can "blow" the tropical cyclone apart, as it displaces the mid-level warm core from the surface circulation and dries out the mid-levels of the troposphere, halting development. In smaller systems, the development of a significant mesoscale convective complex in a sheared environment can send out a large enough outflow boundary to destroy the surface cyclone. Moderate wind shear can lead to the initial development of the convective complex and surface low similar to the mid-latitudes, but it must relax to allow tropical cyclogenesis to continue.

Favorable trough interactions
Limited vertical wind shear can be positive for tropical cyclone formation. When an upper-level trough or upper-level low is roughly the same scale as the tropical disturbance, the system can be steered by the upper level system into an area with better diffluence aloft, which can cause further development. Weaker upper cyclones are better candidates for a favorable interaction. There is evidence that weakly sheared tropical cyclones initially develop more rapidly than non-sheared tropical cyclones, although this comes at the cost of a peak in intensity with much weaker wind speeds and higher minimum pressure. This process is also known as baroclinic initiation of a tropical cyclone. Trailing upper cyclones and upper troughs can cause additional outflow channels and aid in the intensification process. Developing tropical disturbances can help create or deepen upper troughs or upper lows in their wake due to the outflow jet emanating from the developing tropical disturbance/cyclone.

There are cases where large, mid-latitude troughs can help with tropical cyclogenesis when an upper-level jet stream passes to the northwest of the developing system, which will aid divergence aloft and inflow at the surface, spinning up the cyclone. This type of interaction is more often associated with disturbances already in the process of recurvature.

Times of formation

Worldwide, tropical cyclone activity peaks in late summer when water temperatures are warmest. Each basin, however, has its own seasonal patterns. On a worldwide scale, May is the least active month, while September is the most active.

In the North Atlantic, a distinct hurricane season occurs from June 1 through November 30, sharply peaking from late August through October. The statistical peak of the North Atlantic hurricane season is September 10. The Northeast Pacific has a broader period of activity, but in a similar time frame to the Atlantic. The Northwest Pacific sees tropical cyclones year-round, with a minimum in February and a peak in early September. In the North Indian basin, storms are most common from April to December, with peaks in May and November.

In the Southern Hemisphere, tropical cyclone activity generally begins in early November and generally ends on April 30. Southern Hemisphere activity peaks in mid-February to early March.  Virtually all the Southern Hemisphere activity is seen from the southern African coast eastward, toward South America. Tropical cyclones are rare events across the south Atlantic Ocean and the far southeastern Pacific Ocean.

Unusual areas of formation

Middle latitudes
Areas farther than 30 degrees from the equator (except in the vicinity of a warm current) are not normally conducive to tropical cyclone formation or strengthening, and areas more than 40 degrees from the equator are often very hostile to such development. The primary limiting factor is water temperatures, although higher shear at increasing latitudes is also a factor. These areas are sometimes frequented by cyclones moving poleward from tropical latitudes. On rare occasions, such as Pablo in 2019, Alex in 2004, Alberto in 1988, and the 1975 Pacific Northwest hurricane, storms may form or strengthen in this region. Typically, tropical cyclones will undergo extratropical transition after recurving polewards, and typically become fully extratropical after reaching 45–50˚ of latitude. The majority of extratropical cyclones tend to restrengthen after completing the transition period.

Near the Equator

Areas within approximately ten degrees latitude of the equator do not experience a significant Coriolis Force, a vital ingredient in tropical cyclone formation. However, a few tropical cyclones have been observed forming within five degrees of the equator.

South Atlantic

A combination of wind shear and a lack of tropical disturbances from the Intertropical Convergence Zone (ITCZ) makes it very difficult for the South Atlantic to support tropical activity. At least 5 tropical cyclones have been observed here such as— a weak tropical storm in 1991 off the coast of Africa near Angola, Hurricane Catarina, which made landfall in Brazil in 2004 at Category 2 strength, a smaller storm in January 2004 located east of Salvador, Brazil, and Tropical Storm Iba in March 2019. The January storm is thought to have reached tropical storm intensity based on scatterometer wind measurements.

Mediterranean and Black Seas

Storms that appear similar to tropical cyclones in structure sometimes occur in the Mediterranean Sea. Examples of these "Mediterranean tropical cyclones" formed in September 1947, September 1969, September 1973, August 1976, January 1982, September 1983, December 1984, December 1985, October 1994, January 1995, October 1996, September 1997, December 2005, September 2006, November 2011, November 2014, November 2017, September 2018, September 2020, November and December 2020. However, there is debate on whether these storms were tropical in nature.

The Black Sea has, on occasion, produced or fueled storms that begin cyclonic rotation, and that appear to be similar to tropical-like cyclones observed in the Mediterranean. Two of these storms reached tropical storm and subtropical storm intensity in August 2002 and September 2005 respectively.

Elsewhere
Tropical cyclogenesis is extremely rare in the far southeastern Pacific Ocean, due to the cold sea-surface temperatures generated by the Humboldt Current, and also due to unfavorable wind shear; as such, there are no records of a tropical cyclone impacting western South America. However, several systems have been observed developing in the region east of 120°W, which is the official eastern boundary of the South Pacific basin. On May 11, 1983, a tropical depression developed near 110°W, which was thought to be the easternmost forming South Pacific tropical cyclone ever observed in the satellite era. In mid-2015, a rare subtropical cyclone was identified in early May, slightly near Chile, even further east than the 1983 tropical depression. This system was unofficially dubbed Katie by researchers. Another subtropical cyclone was identified at 77.8 degrees longitude west in May 2018, just off the coast of Chile. This system was unofficially named Lexi by researchers. A subtropical cyclone was spotted just off the Chilean coast in January 2022, named Humberto by researchers.

Vortices have been reported off the coast of Morocco in the past. However, it is debatable if they are truly tropical in character.

Tropical activity is also extremely rare in the Great Lakes. However, a storm system that appeared similar to a subtropical or tropical cyclone formed in September 1996 over Lake Huron. The system developed an eye-like structure in its center, and it may have briefly been a subtropical or tropical cyclone.

Inland intensification

Tropical cyclones typically began to weaken immediately following and sometimes even prior to landfall as they lose the sea fueled heat engine and friction slows the winds. However, under some circumstances, tropical or subtropical cyclones may maintain or even increase their intensity for several hours in what is known as the brown ocean effect. This is most likely to occur with warm moist soils or marshy areas, with warm ground temperatures and flat terrain, and when upper level support remains conducive.

Influence of large-scale climate cycles

Influence of ENSO

El Niño (ENSO) shifts the region (warmer water, up and down welling at different locations, due to winds) in the Pacific and Atlantic where more storms form, resulting in nearly constant accumulated cyclone energy (ACE) values in any one basin. The El Niño event typically decreases hurricane formation in the Atlantic, and far western Pacific and Australian regions, but instead increases the odds in the central North and South Pacific and particular in the western North Pacific typhoon region.

Tropical cyclones in the northeastern Pacific and north Atlantic basins are both generated in large part by tropical waves from the same wave train.

In the Northwestern Pacific, El Niño shifts the formation of tropical cyclones eastward. During El Niño episodes, tropical cyclones tend to form in the eastern part of the basin, between 150°E and the International Date Line (IDL). Coupled with an increase in activity in the North-Central Pacific (IDL to 140°W) and the South-Central Pacific (east of 160°E), there is a net increase in tropical cyclone development near the International Date Line on both sides of the equator. While there is no linear relationship between the strength of an El Niño and tropical cyclone formation in the Northwestern Pacific, typhoons forming during El Niño years tend to have a longer duration and higher intensities. Tropical cyclogenesis in the Northwestern Pacific is suppressed west of 150°E in the year following an El Niño event.

Influence of the MJO

In general, westerly wind increases associated with the Madden–Julian oscillation lead to increased tropical cyclogenesis in all basins. As the oscillation propagates from west to east, it leads to an eastward march in tropical cyclogenesis with time during that hemisphere's summer season. There is an inverse relationship between tropical cyclone activity in the western Pacific basin and the north Atlantic basin, however. When one basin is active, the other is normally quiet, and vice versa. The main cause appears to be the phase of the Madden–Julian oscillation, or MJO, which is normally in opposite modes between the two basins at any given time.

Influence of equatorial Rossby waves

Research has shown that trapped equatorial Rossby wave packets can increase the likelihood of tropical cyclogenesis in the Pacific Ocean, as they increase the low-level westerly winds within that region, which then leads to greater low-level vorticity. The individual waves can move at approximately 1.8 m/s (4 mph) each, though the group tends to remain stationary.

Seasonal forecasts
Since 1984, Colorado State University has been issuing seasonal tropical cyclone forecasts for the north Atlantic basin, with results that they claim are better than climatology. The university claims to have found several statistical relationships for this basin that appear to allow long range prediction of the number of tropical cyclones. Since then, numerous others have issued seasonal forecasts for worldwide basins. The predictors are related to regional oscillations in the global climate system: the Walker circulation which is related to the El Niño–Southern Oscillation; the North Atlantic oscillation (NAO); the Arctic oscillation (AO); and the Pacific North American pattern (PNA).

See also
Invest (meteorology)
Monsoon trough
Tropical cyclone forecasting

References

External links

Current AO conditions
Current ENSO conditions
Current MJO conditions
Current NAO conditions
Current PNA conditions
Maximum Potential Intensity
Maximum Potential Intensity Maps Worldwide
Tropical Cyclone Heat Potential

Tropical cyclone meteorology